Roman Berdnikov may refer to:
 Roman Berdnikov (general) — a Russian general
 Roman Berdnikov (ice hockey) — a Russian ice hockey player